Joseph Scott Wolff (June 14, 1878 – February 27, 1958) was a U.S. Representative from Missouri.

Born on a farm in Westmoreland County near Greensburg, Pennsylvania, Wolff attended public schools.
He served with the Fourth United States Cavalry in the Philippine Islands during the Spanish–American War 1899-1901.
He moved to St. Louis, Missouri, in 1901.
He graduated from the dental department of Washington University in St. Louis in 1905. He practiced his profession in St. Louis and Festus, Missouri.
He served as mayor of Festus, Missouri from 1907 to 1911 and 1915 to 1917.
He served as member of the State house of representatives 1913-1915.
He graduated from the St. Louis College of Law and Finance in 1923.
He was admitted to the bar the same year and commenced practice in Festus, Missouri.

Wolff was elected as a Democrat to the Sixty-eighth Congress (March 4, 1923 – March 3, 1925).
He was an unsuccessful candidate for reelection in 1924 to the Sixty-ninth Congress.
He moved to Kansas City in 1924 and continued the practice of dentistry and law until retirement in 1957.
He died in Kansas City, Missouri on February 27, 1958.
He was interred in Gambel Cemetery, Festus, Missouri.

References

1878 births
1958 deaths
Washington University School of Dental Medicine alumni
People from Festus, Missouri
Mayors of places in Missouri
Democratic Party members of the United States House of Representatives from Missouri
American dentists
People from Westmoreland County, Pennsylvania
Politicians from Kansas City, Missouri
Washington University in St. Louis alumni